Iris reichenbachii is a perennial bearded iris species native to Bulgaria, Montenegro, Serbia, North Macedonia, and into northeast Greece. Flowers are dull purple, yellow, or violet, with each stem giving one or two flowers.

It is sometimes commonly known as the 'Rock iris' in Romania.

References

reichenbachii
Plants described in 1858
Flora of Greece
Flora of North Macedonia
Flora of Serbia
Flora of Montenegro
Garden plants of Europe